Thierry Henry is a retired French international footballer, who held the record for the most goals scored for the France national team until being surpassed by Olivier Giroud in 2022. During his international career he played 123 games for France in which he scored 51 goals. Henry made his international debut against South Africa in a 2–1 victory in October 1997. His first international goal came in the 1998 FIFA World Cup against South Africa. He surpassed the previous all-time French goal-scoring record, held by Michel Platini, in October 2007 when he scored twice against Lithuania, taking his tally to 43. Henry retired from international football in July 2010 after a 13-year career, making his final appearance as a substitute, against South Africa, in France's "disastrous" (lowest ever Finals placement) 2010 FIFA World Cup campaign. Henry scored his 51st and final goal for France against Austria the preceding October.

Henry never scored an international hat-trick, although he did score twice in a match on seven occasions. He scored more times against Malta than any other team, with four goals, scored in back-to-back qualifiers for UEFA Euro 2004. More than half of Henry's goals came in home matches, 31 of his 51 goals being scored in France, including 20 at the Stade de France.

16 of Henry's goals came in friendlies. A tally of four goals in the 2003 FIFA Confederations Cup made Henry the tournament's top scorer and led to his being voted the "tournament's most outstanding player". He scored twelve goals in UEFA European Championship qualifiers, including six in the qualification phase of UEFA Euro 2004, where he finished as third-equal top scorer, behind Slovenia's Ermin Šiljak and Spain's Raúl.

List of international goals
Scores and results list France's goal tally first. Score column indicates score after each Henry goal.

Statistics
Source:

See also 

 List of international goals scored by Zinedine Zidane
List of top international men's association football goal scorers by country
List of men's footballers with 50 or more international goals

Notes

References

France national football team records and statistics
Henry